Michael F. Williams (born 1962, New Zealand) is a composer of contemporary classical music. He has received commissions from many of New Zealand's major musical institutions such as the New Zealand Symphony Orchestra, NBR New Zealand Opera and Chamber Music New Zealand and his work is regularly broadcast on Radio New Zealand Concert. A lecturer in composition at the University of Waikato, Williams has received recognition in the NZSO-SOUNZ Readings on three occasions and in the SOUNZ Contemporary Award in 2012 for his multimedia World War II opera, The Juniper Passion.

Discography

Selected Works

The Juniper Passion, Atoll Records
The Prodigal Child, Atoll Records
Rozmowa/Dialogue, Atoll Records
Ahi, Atoll Records
Breathe, Atoll Records

Awards

Selected Awards

NZSO-SOUNZ Readings 2001: Synaesthesia
NZSO-SOUNZ Readings 2008: In Saecula Saeculorum
NZSO-SOUNZ Readings 2010: Convergence - Triple Concerto
SOUNZ Contemporary Award 2012: The Juniper Passion

External links
University of Waikato, Music Department
SOUNZ Centre for New Zealand Music
Music Live New Zealand
Composer Website
Atoll Records

References

New Zealand classical composers
Male classical composers
New Zealand opera composers
1962 births
Living people